Paul Bernard Henze (29 August 1924, Redwood Falls – 19 May 2011, Culpeper) was an American  broadcaster, writer and CIA operative. He was involved with Radio Free Europe and wrote  The Plot to Kill the Pope which advocated the view that the Bulgarians were involved in an assassination attempt on John Paul II in 1981.

Henze encouraged Zbigniew Brzezinski in the formation of the Nationalities Working Group in 1978, of which Henze was appointed head. Influenced by his friend Alexandre Bennigsen, this group advocated the promotion of islamism as a tool for undermining Soviet hegemony in Central Asia.

Works 

Henze has published 156 works, including:
 Layers of Time : A History of Ethiopia (35 editions, 1999–2004) 
 The Plot to Kill the Pope (18 editions, 1983–1985) 
 The Horn of Africa : From War to Peace (18 editions, 1991–2016)

References

1924 births
2011 deaths
CIA and Islamism
People from Redwood Falls, Minnesota
People of the Central Intelligence Agency
American broadcasters